The Cabra Island Lighthouse is a historic lighthouse built on Cabra Island, the north-westernmost of the Lubang group of islands in Occidental Mindoro, Philippines.  International vessels entering the Philippines from South China Sea were welcomed by the Cabra Light and directed either towards Manila Bay or the center of the archipelago through Verde Island Passage, one of busiest sea routes of the Philippines.

History
The lighthouse of Cabra was the first completed during Spain's revitalized program of lighthouse construction in the Philippines.  Construction was started on May 3, 1885, and it was first lit on March 1, 1889.  It was also the first of the five first-order lighthouses built by the Spaniards in the latter part of their colonization of the archipelago.

Description
It is visible around the entire horizon except where obscured by Lubang and Ambil Islands.

Current condition
The original lighthouse was replaced by the Philippine Coast Guard with a new solar-powered tower located next to the previous tower under its Maritime Safety Improvement Project.  After the replacement, the lighthouse was abandoned and left open for thieves and vandals.  The expensive first-order lens were vandalized with the large front Fresnel lenses all gone.  The original bronze marker were stolen by thieves and is now replaced by the locals with a white board with the original inscriptions.  The roof of the keeper's house and utility rooms have since collapsed. The lighthouse is closed to visitors due to its dilapidated state.

See also

 List of lighthouses in the Philippines

References

External links
 Maritime Safety Services Command 
Cabra Island Light on Lighthouse Depot
A Cabra Island Lighthouse page from Lubang Island Website

Lighthouses completed in 1889
Lighthouses in the Philippines
Spanish colonial infrastructure in the Philippines
Buildings and structures in Occidental Mindoro